Michael Farn (born 23 February 1988 in Durham) is an English ice hockey player currently playing for Milton Keynes Lightning of the English Premier Ice Hockey League.

Career
He began his career in 2003 with the Billingham Bombers of the ENL where he stayed until 2005. After a year away from ice hockey he signed for the Swindon Wildcats in the EPL. In summer 2009, Nick Poole signed Michael to his Milton Keynes Lightning squad after 2 impressive seasons at Swindon. In 09/10 Michael won the EPL title and re-signed with the team at the end of the 2011/2012 season.

International career
Between 2005 and 2006 Farn represented the Great Britain National Team  at both the Under 18 & Under 20 World Junior Championships.
2012-2013 Plays as a defender for Milton Keynes Lightning
Current Stats
Game Played
8	
Goals
1	
Assists
2	
Total Points ( Goal = 1 Point + Assist = 1 Pont)
3
Penalty Minutes
8

References

1988 births
English Premier Ice Hockey League players
Living people
Sportspeople from Durham, England
English ice hockey defencemen